The Cathay is a mixed-use 17-storey cinema, shopping mall and apartment building located at Handy Road and Mount Sophia in the Museum Planning Area of Singapore.

History

Owned and managed by Cathay Organisation, the original building was opened in 1939 as Cathay Building. In 2000, it was closed and partially demolished for redevelopment. Elements of the old Cathay Cinema, including its facade which was conserved as a national monument, together with a modern-day design by Paul Tange of Tange Associates Japan and RDC Architects Pte Ltd Singapore, were incorporated into the new building.

Background
The Cathay was opened on 24 March 2006. The building housed retail, food & beverage outlets and an 8-screen Cathay Cineplex which includes The Picturehouse. The Cathay Residences opened towards the end of 2006.

Gallery

See also
 List of shopping malls in Singapore
 Façadism

References

 Fiona Chan, "Cathay tenants get new round of rental rebates", The Straits Times, 20 October 2006

External links

 The Cathay's Website
 Cathay Organisation's Website

Cinemas in Singapore
Shopping malls in Singapore
Buildings and structures completed in 2006
Orchard Road
Museum Planning Area
Buildings and structures completed in 1939
20th-century architecture in Singapore